Lothian Cemetery is one of the oldest Christian cemeteries in Delhi and is located on Lothian Road, which lies near the Kauria Bridge bus stop, near the General Post Office at Kashmiri Gate in Old Delhi.

History 
This is the oldest graveyard of the Christian community of Delhi, whose members were buried here between 1808 and 1867.  Lothian cemetery was built in 1808 and closed to burials in the 1960s.  This burial ground is known as a haunted place in Delhi.  Numerous European soldiers were buried here, with most of them killed during the first battle of the independence of India in 1857 or the Indian Rebellion of 1857. Staffs of the East India Company, British women, and children who had died in cholera epidemics were also buried there.  Although the cemetery is under the preservation of the Archaeological Survey of India, it is presently seen in a dilapidated state.

Myth 
Many mythical stories are related to Lothian Cemetery. Rumors are that one British officer, Sir Nicholas's ghost roams the graveyard. Nicholas fell in love with an Indian lady but could not be married. Heartbroken Nicholas shot himself in the head. Some people believe a headless Nicholas cries out the name of the woman he loved and walks in the cemetery.

Gallery

See also 
 Delhi War Cemetery
 Nicholson Cemetery

References 

Cemeteries in India
North Delhi district
Monuments of National Importance in Delhi
1806 establishments in India